Last Year's Waltz is a live album by the Steve Kuhn Quartet featuring Sheila Jordan recorded in 1981 and released on the ECM label.

Reception 
The Allmusic review by Scott Yanow awarded the album 3 stars stating "Although Jordan functions as a member of the band, her highly appealing singing is the main reason to acquire this memorable and well-rounded disc".

Track listing 
All compositions by Steve Kuhn except as indicated

 "Turn to Gold" - 4:01
 "The Drinking Song" - 5:55
 "Last Year's Waltz" - 4:18
 "I Remember You" (Schertzinger, Mercer) - 8:40
 "Mexico" (Harvie Swartz) - 5:18
 "The Fruit Fly" - 5:52
 "The Feeling Within" - 4:48
 "Medley: Old Folks/Well, You Needn't" (Dedette Lee Hill, Robison, Monk) - 2:05
 "Confirmation" (Parker) - 5:35
 "The City of Dallas" (Steve Swallow) - 3:48

Personnel 
 Steve Kuhn - piano
 Sheila Jordan - voice
 Harvie Swartz - bass 
 Bob Moses - drums

References 

ECM Records albums
Steve Kuhn albums
Sheila Jordan albums
1982 albums